Magnificat is a 1993 Italian drama film directed by Pupi Avati. It was entered into the 1993 Cannes Film Festival.

Cast
 Luigi Diberti - Lord of Malfole
 Arnaldo Ninchi - Folco
 Massimo Bellinzoni - Baino
 Dalia Lahav - Rozal
 Lorella Morlotti - Venturina
 Massimo Sarchielli - Margherita's Father
 Brizio Montinaro - Lord of Campodose
 Marcello Cesena - Agateo
 Consuelo Ferrara - Abbess
 Eleonora Alessandrelli - Margherita
 David Celli - Bagnaro
 Vincenzo Crocitti - Agnello
 Nando Gazzolo - (voice)
 Dalia Lamav Zagni
 Mario Patanè - Benigno
 Rosa Pianeta
 Lucio Salis
 Andrea Scorzoni - Lord of Manfole
 Sofia Spada - Martinella

References

External links

1993 films
1990s Italian-language films
1993 drama films
Films directed by Pupi Avati
Italian drama films
1990s Italian films